Mid-Beach is a section of the city of Miami Beach, Florida.  It is portion of the city which encompasses the area north of 23rd Street and the Indian Creek and south of Surprise Lake and 63rd Street.  It collectively refers to neighborhoods including Oceanfront, Bayshore, and Nautilus.

The main street of the mid-beach section is 41st Street. It is the center of Jewish life in Miami Beach.

Famous buildings in the Oceanfront neighborhood are the Fontainebleau Hotel, the Eden Roc, Faena Hotel Miami Beach, Faena Forum, the Ocean Spray Hotel and the Blue and Green Diamond.

The historic Collins Waterfront Architectural District is part of Mid-Beach.

See also
South Beach
North Beach

References

External links

Neighborhoods in Miami Beach, Florida
Populated coastal places in Florida on the Atlantic Ocean